Kabo is a town in the northern Central African Republic, lying north west of Kaga Bandoro.  It is a market town and the border post for Chad.

History
The northern nomads in the Central African Republic resented the central government and a rebel People's Army for the Restoration of the Republic and Democracy (PAPRD) was formed in the 1990s. Clashes between the rebels and the central government intensified, and many people from Kabo and the surrounding area fled as refugees to Chad.  However, in January 2008, PAPRD and the Central African Armed Forces (FACA) agreed on a ceasefire for the Kabo area, allowing many of the refugees to return. On 19 December 2012 the city was captured by Séléka coalition. As of 2020 it was under control of ex-Séléka Central African Patriotic Movement. On 15 April 2021 Kabo was recaptured by government forces.

Notes

External links
 
 

Sub-prefectures of the Central African Republic
Populated places in Ouham-Fafa